U;Nee Code is the debut studio album by South Korean singer, U;Nee. It was released on June 12, 2003, on Synnara Music.

Overview
U;Nee Code marks the debut of K-pop singer, U;Nee. The album has 13 songs ranging from dance-pop songs, ("가, 넌 딱 걸렸어" (Oh! Punch!), "두번째 트릭 (Trick 2)", "Disco Queen" and "Play"), R&B-oriented tunes ("Sun Cruise", "Happy Together", "Trick I" and "To You"), traditional Asian music ("Adieu" and "애가"), and even an Indian-styled song ("너의 욕망"). The songs Play and Happy Together also marked U;Nee's rapping debut, which she soon repeated for some songs on her 2005 album, Call Call Call. The only single from the album was "가", but "두번째 트릭 (Trick 2)" was performed numerous times during promotion of the album. However, the video version of "가" is not on the album. The music video for "Go (가)" was U;Nee's first music video, and had a very dark theme with a message of a trapped (or caged) person wanting to be free. Many fans speculated after her death that the video could've been expressing her depression, and her need to be happy and free. This song proved to be one of her most popular, as it was covered by Japanese artist, DJ Ozma.

Track listing

Promoted Songs
가 (Go)

가 (Go) (Club Mix)

두번째 트릭 (Trick 2)

References

2003 debut albums
U;Nee albums